The Sunrise Cup World Team Championship was a professional golf tournament contested by teams of two female golfers representing their respective countries. The tournament was played at the Sunrise Golf & Country Club in Taiwan.

The field consisted of sixteen teams and each qualifying country could field one team. It was only held in October 1992 and was included on the Ladies European Tour schedule as an unofficial team event. It had a purse of $500,000.

Typhoon Yvette impacted play with extremely strong winds and delays.

Winners

Scores
Team

Individual Trophy

Source:

See also
Women's World Cup of Golf – the World Team Championship held 2005 to 2008.

References

External links
Ladies European Tour

Former Ladies European Tour events
Team golf tournaments
Golf tournaments in Taiwan
Golf
World championships in golf